Linderiella africana is a species of fairy shrimp in the family Chirocephalidae. It is found in Africa.

References

Further reading

 

Anostraca
Articles created by Qbugbot
Crustaceans described in 1986